CM-4620 is a drug which acts as a selective inhibitor of the calcium channel ORAI1. It has antiinflammatory effects and is being researched for the treatment of pancreatitis.

References 

Anti-inflammatory agents
Calcium channel blockers
Aminopyrimidines
Benzodioxoles